Conseil scolaire de district catholique Franco-Nord is the Roman Catholic separate, French language school board for Ontario District of Nipissing. It is headquartered in North Bay, and serves the communities of Mattawa, Bonfield, Astorville, Thorne, North Bay, Sturgeon Falls, River Valley and Verner. This school board has 17 schools in total, including 3 secondary schools.

Elementary schools
École Christ-Roi, River Valley
École élémentaire catholique Saint-Joseph, Sturgeon Falls
École élémentaire catholique Sainte-Anne, Mattawa
École élémentaire catholique Saints-Anges, North Bay
École La Résurrection, Sturgeon Falls
École Lorrain, Bonfield
École Mariale, Thorne
École St-Raymond, North Bay
École St-Thomas d'Aquin, Astorville
École St-Vincent, North Bay
École Ste-Marguerite d'Youville, Verner

Secondary schools
École secondaire catholique Algonquin, North Bay
École secondaire catholique Élisabeth-Bruyère, Mattawa
École secondaire catholique Franco-Cité, Sturgeon Falls

See also
List of school districts in Ontario
List of high schools in Ontario

References

French-language school districts in Ontario
Roman Catholic school districts in Ontario